Islam Zyaudinovich Tsuroyev (born 23 April 1989) is a former Russian professional footballer.

Club career
He made his professional debut in the Russian First Division in 2006 for FC Angusht Nazran.

External links

References

1989 births
Living people
Russian footballers
Association football forwards
FC Akhmat Grozny players
FC Angusht Nazran players
Russian Premier League players
Russian people of Chechen descent
Chechen people